Workin' is a studio album by organist Shirley Scott recorded for Prestige, released in 1967 as PRLP 7424.

Track listing 
"Miles' Theme" - 3:05
"Autumn Leaves" (Prevert, Mercer, Kosma) - 5:39
"Bridge Blue" (Scott) - 5:30
"Slaughter on 10th Avenue" (Rodgers) - 3:37
"Work Song" (Nat Adderley) - 6:52
"Chapped Chops" (Scott) - 10:30

Personnel 
Tracks 1, 4
 Shirley Scott - organ
 George Duvivier - bass
 Arthur Edgehill - drums

Tracks 2-3
 Shirley Scott - organ
 George Tucker - bass
 Arthur Edgehill - drums

Tracks 5-6
 Shirley Scott - organ
 Ronnell Bright - piano
 Wally Richardson - guitar
 Peck Morrison - bass
 Roy Haynes - drums

References 

1967 albums
Albums produced by Bob Weinstock
Albums produced by Esmond Edwards
Albums recorded at Van Gelder Studio
Prestige Records albums
Shirley Scott albums